"Blue Angels" is a hip-hop song by Pras Michel, released as the third single from his debut solo studio album, Ghetto Supastar. The track features vocals from American group The Product G&B. The single was released on September 28, 1998 as a last minute replacement for What'cha Wanna Do, which was removed from shelves just days before release. Vocal & instrumental parts from “Grease” theme are sampled in. The music video (directed by Antoine Fuqua) features Pras on a submarine that is about to crash. His mission to save the crew members is thwarted when the ship implodes, causing everyone but Pras to die, as he manages to escape by jumping over the side of the ship.

Track listing
 UK CD1
 "Blue Angels" (4:18)
 "Blue Angels" (K Gee Remix) (5:57)
 "Blue Angels" (Seani B Remix) (6:13)

 UK CD2
 "Blue Angels" (4:18)
 "Ghetto Supastar" (The Black Apple Remix) (5:03)
 "Murder Dem" (3:52)

Charts

Weekly charts

Year-end charts

References

1997 songs
1998 singles
Pras songs
Columbia Records singles
Songs written by Pras
Music videos directed by Antoine Fuqua